Natoma is a city in Osborne County, Kansas, United States.  As of the 2020 census, the population of the city was 302.

History
Natoma was established in 1888, named after an American Indian railroad employee by a railroad officer. The name means "new born". The first post office had opened under the name Tapley in December 1878, but changed its name to Natoma in July 1890. Natoma was incorporated as a city in 1905.

Geography
Paradise Creek, a tributary of the Saline, flows southeast along the southern edge of the city.

Demographics

2010 census
As of the 2010 census, there were 335 people, 160 households and 86 families residing in the city. The racial makeup was 97.0% White, 0.9% African American, 1.2% Asian, and 0.9% from two or more races. Hispanic or Latino of any race were 2.1% of the population.

There were 160 households, of which 25.6% had children under the age of 18 living with them, 40.0% were married couples living together, 8.8% had a female householder with no husband present, 5.0% had a male householder with no wife present, and 46.3% were non-families. 43.1% of all households were made up of individuals, and 18.8% had someone living alone who was 65 years of age or older. The average household size was 2.09 and the average family size was 2.86.

The median age was 43.5 years. 23.3% of residents were under the age of 18; 6.1% were between the ages of 18 and 24; 23.1% were from 25 to 44; 21.9% were from 45 to 64; and 26% were 65 years of age or older. The gender make-up  was 54.9% male and 45.1% female.

2000 census
As of the 2000 census, there were 367 people, 178 households and 95 families residing in the city. The population density was 
. The racial make-up was 98.91% White, 0.27% Native American, 0.27% Asian, 0.27% from other races, and 0.27% from two or more races. Hispanic or Latino of any race were 1.09% of the population.

There were 178 households, of which 25.3% had children under the age of 18 living with them, 46.1% were married couples living together, 3.4% had a female householder with no husband present, and 46.6% were non-families. 44.4% of all households were made up of individuals, and 21.3% had someone living alone who was 65 years of age or older. The average household size was 2.06 and the average family size was 2.88.

24.8% of the population were under the age of 18, 4.6% from 18 to 24, 25.1% from 25 to 44, 20.7% from 45 to 64, and 24.8% who were 65 years of age or older. The median age was 42 years. For every 100 females, there were 105.0 males. For every 100 females age 18 and over, there were 100.0 males.

The median household income was $24,091 and the median family income was $37,500. Males had a median income of $24,896 and females $22,083. The per capita income was $14,671. About 8.7% of families and 15.9% of the population were below the poverty line, including 13.7% of those under age 18 and 9.6% of those age 65 or over.

Culture

Events
The city holds a Labor Day celebration which as its annual community festival which includes a parade, barbecue and other entertainment.

Points of interest
Natoma Presbyterian Church, constructed in 1899, is listed in the National Register of Historic Places for its architecture.

Education
Natoma is a part of unified school district 399 Paradise Natoma Waldo. USD 399 has two schools in the city:  
 Natoma Elementary School (Grades K-6)
 Natoma High School (7-12)

The Natoma Tigers have won the following Kansas State High School championships:
 1958 Boys' basketball - Class B 
 1959 Boys' basketball - Class B 
 1974 Boys' cross country - Class 1A  
 1975 Boys' basketball - Class 1A 
 1982 Girls' basketball - Class 1A 
 2014 Boys' cross country - Class 1A 
 2015 Boys' cross country - Class 1A

Transportation
K-18, an east–west route, approaches Natoma from the west, then turns southeast along the eastern side of the city.

References

Further reading

External links

 City of Natoma
 Natoma - Directory of Public Officials
 USD 399, local school district
 Natoma city map, KDOT

Cities in Kansas
Cities in Osborne County, Kansas
Populated places established in 1888
1888 establishments in Kansas